The 2018 King's Cup is an international football tournament that is currently being held in Thailand from 23 to 25 March 2018. The 4 national teams involved in the tournament are required to register a squad of 23 players.

Players marked (c) were named as captain for their national squad. Number of caps counts until the start of the tournament, including all FIFA-recognized pre-tournament friendlies. Player's age is their age on the opening day of the tournament.

Coach: José Antonio Camacho

The following 27 players were called up for the 2018 King's Cup.Last match updated was against   Botswana on 15 November 2017.

Coach: Ján Kozák

Coach: Milovan Rajevac

The following 23 players were called up for the 2018 King's Cup on 8 March 2018.Last match updated was against   Kenya on 8 October 2017.

Coach: Alberto Zaccheroni

References

King's Cup